This list is of towns and cities in Devon in order of their population, according to the 2011 census data from the Office for National Statistics. It comprises the Key Statistics for local authorities, civil parishes and wards that attempt to show their populations. The largest settlement in Devon is the city and unitary authority of Plymouth with a population of 256,720, whereas the smallest settlement was the town and civil parish of Beer with a population of 1,317. The city of Exeter, which is home to Exeter Cathedral, is the county town and headquarters of Devon County Council. The ceremonial county of Devon includes unitary authority areas of Plymouth and Torbay, but the non-metropolitan county of Devon excludes such unitary authority areas. It is governed by Devon County Council, whereas Plymouth and Torbay can govern themselves on matters such as transport and education.

Traditionally a town is any settlement which has received a charter of incorporation, more commonly known as a town charter, approved by the monarch. However, since 1974, any civil parish has the right to declare itself as a town. Prior to 1888, city status was given to settlements home to a cathedral of the Church of England such as Exeter. After 1888 it was no longer a necessary condition, leading to Plymouth gaining city-status in 1928. Historical towns such as Plympton, Stonehouse and Devonport, which were merged into the city of Plymouth, have not been included, as well as Topsham, which became a part of Exeter's urban district, and St Marychurch, which was annexed by Torquay. However, the unitary authority area of Torbay recognises the three towns of Torquay, Paignton and Brixham. The ward for Ottery St Mary is also included, as it is titled Ottery St Mary Town.

Changes to population structures have, however, led to explosions in non-traditional settlements that do not fall into traditional, bureaucratic definitions of 'towns'.  Several villages, which are not included in this list, have grown steadily and are more populous than many towns.  For example, the ward of Fremington, with a population of 4,310. would be ranked 34 whilst its neighbour Braunton civil parish, with a population of 8,128, would be ranked 21.

See also
List of urban areas in the United Kingdom
List of English districts by population
Subdivisions of Scotland § Council areas
List of Welsh principal areas
List of districts in Northern Ireland (pre-2015)
Travel to work area

References

Towns and cities
 
Devon